Luis Omar Hernández Hernández (born 8 November 1985) in Guadalajara, Jalisco is a Mexican former professional footballer who last played for Deportivo Chiantla as defender.
He made his debut July 30, 2005 in a match against Toluca, a game which resulted in a 0–0 tie for Necaxa.  After obtaining the championship with Necaxa in the Mexico Liga de Ascenso (2nd tier league), Hernandez was placed on the transferable list and was loaned out to San Luis F.C. for the upcoming Torneo Apertura 2010 in Mexico.

Honours

Club
Necaxa
Copa MX: Clausura 2018

External links

 
 
 
 Luis Omar Hernández at Footballdatabase

1985 births
Living people
Mexican footballers
Liga MX players
Club Necaxa footballers
San Luis F.C. players
Lobos BUAP footballers
Footballers from Guadalajara, Jalisco
Association football defenders